Laura Roper is an Australian sailor. She competed in the 2011 Sydney to Hobart Yacht Race skippering Natelle Two. Her time in the race was 5 days 3 minutes and 12 seconds, coming in to Hobart at 1:03pm on 31 December 2011. She competed with the same boat in the 2019 Sydney to Hobart Yacht Race as one of only nine female skippers.

References

Australian female sailors (sport)
Living people
Year of birth missing (living people)